Paul Webster may refer to:

 Paul Webster (jazz) (1909–1966), American big band musician
 Paul Webster (journalist) (born 1954), British journalist, editor of The Observer
 Paul Webster (producer) (born 1952), British film producer
 Paul Francis Webster (1907–1984), American lyricist
Paul Webster, character in the 1959 film The Alligator People